Čarobnjaci (English: Wizards) is the fourth studio album by the Yugoslav and Bosnian heavy metal band Divlje Jagode. The album was recorded in Bad Homburg vor der Höhe, Germany and was released November 1983.

Track listing

Personnel
Sead Lipovača - Co-producer, Music By, Arranged By
Alen Islamović - lead vocals, bass
Nasko Budimlić - drums

Production
Theo Werdin - producer
Ulli Werdin - assistant producer

References

External links

1983 albums
Alen Islamović albums
Divlje jagode albums